The Lazy Dog (sometimes called a Red Dot Bomb or Yellow Dog Bomb) was a small, unguided kinetic projectile used by the U.S. Air Force.

The weapons were designed to be dropped from an aircraft. They contained no explosive charge but as they fell they would develop significant kinetic energy making them lethal and able to easily penetrate soft cover such as jungle canopy, several inches of sand, or light armor. Lazy Dog munitions were simple and relatively cheap; they could be dropped in huge numbers in a single pass. Though their effects were often no more deadly than other projectiles, they did not leave unexploded ordnance (UXO) that could be active years after a conflict ended.

Lazy Dog projectiles were used primarily during the Korean and the Vietnam Wars.

Development

Lazy Dog munitions had precursors in air-dropped flechettes dating from World War I. These flechettes were used as anti-personnel weapons, in Zeppelin raids carried out by the German Navy Airship L4.

Lazy Dogs in their familiar form were descended from projectiles of almost identical design and appearance that were originally developed early in World War II (as early as 1941). The Korean War–era and Vietnam War–era "Lazy  Dog" was further developed, tested and deployed into the 1950s and 1960s.

Originally an Armament Laboratory program codenamed Lazy Dog, the weapon's development involved Delco Products Corporation, F&F Mold and Die Works, Inc., Haines Designed Products, and Master Vibrator Company of Dayton. The project objective was to design and test free-fall missiles and their dispensing units for use in bombers and fighters. Lazy Dog anti-personnel missiles were designed to spray enemy troops with small projectiles with three times the force of standard air-burst bombs. The Armament Laboratory worked with the Flight Test Laboratory to conduct wind tunnel tests of a number of bomb shapes which design studies indicated to be the most efficient for storage and release from high performance aircraft.

Experimental Lazy Dog projectiles of various shapes and sizes were tested at Air Proving Ground, Eglin AFB, Florida, in late 1951 and early 1952. The result was eight hits per square yard (approximately nine hits per square metre). Tests revealed Shapes 2 and 5 to be the most effective. Shape 5, an improved basic Lazy Dog slug, had the force of a .50 BMG bullet and could penetrate  of packed sand. Shape 2 could penetrate  of sand—twice as much as a .45 ACP slug fired point blank.

Deployment 

The Shape 2 projectile was sent to the Far East Air Force for combat use by mid-1952. FEAF immediately ordered 16,000 Lazy Dog weapon systems. The US Air Force Armament Laboratory spent 90 days in Japan establishing local manufacture of the Lazy Dog weapons and training crew members in their use. Project Lazy Dog continued throughout 1952 to determine the optimum characteristics for stable dispersion containers and the feasibility of substituting a Lazy Dog warhead for the explosive nose of the Matador missile. The Lazy Dog program remained ongoing in the late 1950s.

Lazy Dog projectiles could be dropped from almost any kind of flying vehicle. They could be hurled from buckets, dropped by hand, thrown in their small paper shipping bags, or placed in a Mark 44 cluster adaptor—a simple hinged casing with bins built in to hold the projectiles, opened by a mechanical time delay fuze. They would be shipped empty, then filled by hand.

Regardless of how they were released into the air, each "Lazy Dog" projectile would develop an enormous amount of kinetic energy as it fell, penetrating nearly any material upon hitting the ground. Some reports say that their speeds often exceeded  before impact.

A variant version of the "Lazy  Dog" projectile was developed for the recoilless rifle. Development was suspended because another type of flechette was used for the recoilless rifle.

See also 
 Concrete bomb
 Kinetic bombardment

References

Bibliography

Cold War aerial bombs of the United States
Anti-personnel weapons